This is a list of butterflies of the Cayman Islands. According to a recent estimate, there are 52 butterfly species found on the Cayman Islands. The abbreviation (Es) is used to indicate endemic subspecies.

Papilionidae
Battus polydamas cubensis (Dufrane, 1946) – Polydamas swallowtail
Heraclides andraemon andraemon (Hübner, 1823) – Andraemon swallowtail
Heraclides andraemon tailori (Rothschild & Jordan, 1906) – Grand Cayman swallowtail (Es)
Heraclides aristodemus (Esper, 1794) – dusky swallowtail

Pieridae

Abaeis nicippe (Cramer, 1779) – black bordered orange, sleepy orange
Anteos maerula (Fabricius, 1775) – yellow angled sulphur
Aphrissa orbis (Poey, 1832) – orbed sulphur
Aphrissa statira cubana (D'Almeida, 1939) – migrant sulphur
Ascia monuste eubotea (Godart, 1819) – great southern white 
Eurema daira palmira (Godart, 1819) – barred sulphur
Eurema elathea (Cramer, 1777) – false barred sulphur
Glutophrissa drusilla poeyi (Butler, 1872) – Florida white
Nathalis iole (Boisduval, 1836) – dainty sulphur, dwarf yellow
Phoebis agarithe antillia (Brown, 1929) – giant orange sulphur
Phoebis argante (Fabricius, 1775) – apricot sulphur, Argante giant sulphur
Phoebis philea (Linnaeus, 1763) – orange-barred sulphur
Phoebis sennae sennae (Linnaeus, 1758) – cloudless sulphur
Pyrisitia lisa euterpe (Ménétriés, 1832) – little sulphur
Pyrisitia messalina (Fabricius, 1787) – shy yellow
Pyrisitia nise nise (Cramer, 1775) – mimosa sulphur, blacktip sulphur

Nymphalidae

Nymphalinae

Anaea troglodyta cubana (Fabricius, 1775) – Cuban red leaf butterfly, troglodyte 
Anartia jatrophae jamaicensis (Möshler, 1886) – white peacock
Euptoieta hegesia hegesia (Cramer, 1779)
Hamadryas amphichloe (Boisduval, 1870) – Haitian cracker, click butterfly
Hypolimnas misippus (Linnaeus, 1764) – mimic
Junonia evarete (Cramer, 1779) – mangrove buckeye
Junonia genoveva (Cramer, 1780) – Caribbean buckeye, tropical buckeye
Marpesia chiron (Fabricius, 1775) – many-banded daggerwing
Marpesia eleuchea (Hübner, 1818) – Antillean ruddy daggerwing
Memphis verticordia danielana (Witt, 1972) – Cayman brown leaf butterfly (Es)
Phyciodes phaon (W.H.Edwards, 1864) – Cayman crescent spot
Phyciodes tharos (Drury, [1773])
Siproeta stelenes bilagiata (Fruhstorfer, 1907) – malachite
Vanessa cardui (Linnaeus, 1758) – painted lady

Danainae

Danaus eresimus tethys (Cramer, 1777) – soldier
Danaus gilippus berenice (Cramer, 1775) – queen
Danaus plexippus (Linnaeus, 1758) – monarch

Satyrinae
Calisto herophile (Hübner, 1823) – ringlet

Heliconiinae

Agraulis vanillae insularis (Maynard, 1889) – Gulf fritillary
Dryas iulia zoe (Miller & Steinhauser, 1992) – Julia, flambeau (Es)
Heliconius charitonius (Linnaeus, 1767) – zebra

Lycaenidae

Brephidium exilis thompsoni (Carpenter & Lewis, 1943) – pygmy blue (Es)
Chlorostrymon maesites (Henrrich-Schäffer, 1864) – amethyst hairstreak
Cyclargus ammon erembis Nabokov, 1948 – Lucas's blue (Es)
Electrostrymon angelia (Hewitson, 1874) – fulvous hairstreak
Eumaeus atala (Poey, 1832) – Atala
Hemiargus hanno filenus (Poey, 1832) – Hanno blue
Leptoptes cassius theonus (Lucas, 1857) – Cassius blue
Strymon acis (Drury, 1773) – Drury's hairstreak
Strymon istapa (Reakirt, 1867) – Hewitson's hairstreak
Strymon martialis (Henrrich-Schäffer, 1865) – Cuban grey hairstreak

Hesperiidae

Asbolis capucinus (Lucas, 1857) – monk
Atalopedes mesogramma (Latreille, 1824) – striped skipper
Calpodes ethlius (Stoll, 1782) – canna skipper, Brazilian skipper
Cymaenes tripuntus (Henrrich-Schäffer, 1865) – three spot skipper
Hylephila phyleus (Drury, 1773) – fiery skipper
Panoquina lucas (Fabricius, 1793) – purple-washed skipper, sugar cane skipper
Panoquina ocala (W. H. Edwards, 1863) – Ocala skipper
Panoquina panoquinoides (Skinner, 1891) – obscure skipper
Phocides pigmalion batabano (Lucas, 1857) – mangrove skipper
Urbanus dorantes santiago (Lucas, 1857) – Dorantes skipper
Urbanus proteus domingo (Scudder, 1872) – long-tailed skipper

References
R. R. Askew and P. A. van B. Stafford, Butterflies of the Cayman Islands (Apollo Books, Stenstrup 2008) 
Cayman Butterflies

Butterflies
Cayman
Butterflies
Cayman
Cayman Islands